The 1965–66 Irish Cup was the 86th edition of the premier knock-out cup competition in Northern Irish football. 

Glentoran won the cup for the 8th time, defeating Linfield 1–0 in the final at The Oval. 

The holders Coleraine were knocked out by Glentoran in the semi-finals.

Results

First round

|}

Replay

|}

Quarter-finals

|}

Replay

|}

Second replay

|}

Semi-finals

|}

Replay

|}

Final

References

External links
The Rec.Sport.Soccer Statistics Foundation - Northern Ireland - Cup Finals

Irish Cup seasons
1965–66 in Northern Ireland association football
1965–66 domestic association football cups